HTC Canary is a smartphone released in November 2002 in Europe and China by the providers Orange and China Mobile, respectively. It was notable for being the first smartphone to run Windows Mobile.

Specifications
Manufacturer: HTC
Distributor: Orange, China Mobile
Availability: Europe, China
Design type: Candybar
Released: November 2002
Operating System: Smartphone 2002
Memory: Ti OMAP 710 132 MHz
Additional Memory: SD & MMC cards
Screen Resolution: 176x220 64k colors
Bands: Tri-band GSM 900,1800,1900
Data: GPRS, WAP
Messaging: SMS, Email
Camera: Plug in adapter
IRDA: Yes
Bluetooth: No
WiFi: No
Java: No
Dimensions:  x  x 
Weight: 
Battery: Li-Ion 1000 mAh
Talk time: 3-5 Hours
Standby: 70-100 Hours
Ringtone: WAV, MIDI
Media Sounds: WMA, MP3
Media video: WMV
Speakers: One

References

External links 

 https://web.archive.org/web/20110716093313/http://www.smartphonehistory.com/specs.php?UID=3
 http://www.phonearena.com/phones/HTC-Canary_id449
 http://gdgt.com/htc/canary/ 

Canary